Beyond is the eighth full-length album by the German power metal band Freedom Call. It was released on February 21, 2014, by SPV. A vinyl version of Beyond was released on March 14, 2014.

Beyond marked the return of founding member, bassist Ilker Ersin, and the addition of Ramy Ali on drums.

Critical reception
Beyond received generally very positive reviews upon release, although the majority of these reviews were by genre-related or genre-specific reviewers. Examples of these included:

In a 9/10 review for The Metal Observer and commenting on a return to form for Freedom Call, Jonathan Smith wrote: At its inception, this album makes little secret of which creative well it’s drawing from. The first eight songs are all but a perfect mixture of the speed happy character of Eternity meshed with the anthem-driven, catchy fanfare of Crystal Empire. In particular, “Union Of The Strong, “Knights Of Taragon” and “Heart Of A Warrior” all but kick the listener into a fit of déjà vu that recalls how this band’s much lauded third album began. Familiar melodies are reworked a bit and the lead guitar work of Lars Rettkowitz is a bit more mellow and methodical than Sascha Gershow’s technical work, but the speed and majestic consonance of each moment begs for a fist to the sky.

In an unscored but favorable review for Metal Injection, Shayne Mathis wrote: ...Freedom Call have consistently released album after album of fun, hyper-melodic power metal that's only gotten better with time, and Beyond may be the band's best album yet. These Germans may not be the most creative or adventurous power metal band out there, but they're definitely one of the most enjoyable. Unless you're a total sourpuss, it's impossible to listen to this album without feeling the urge to smile (or battle a dragon while soaring on the wings of an eagle). He continued: Despite the mammoth running time and rote formula the songs lapse into occasionally, Beyond is still an entertaining record for fans of triumphant metal. This is an album best experienced blasting through car speakers with the windows rolled down on the way to meet your friends for beers and good times.

In a 7.5/10 review for Hardrockhaven.net, Justin Gaines wrote: Freedom Call – a.k.a. the happiest power metal band in the universe – are back with a new studio offering... ...titled Beyond. The long-running German band took a risk with their last album – 2012’s Land of the Crimson Dawn – where they mixed in quirky, Edguy-style rock songs with their usual shiny, happy, power metal. It wasn’t terribly well received, so the band is back on (very) familiar territory with Beyond. If you have at least one older Freedom Call album, you probably know what to expect from Beyond. The band basically takes the Helloween formula and makes it even faster and more melodic. Between Chris Bay’s melodic guitar work and his high-pitched vocals, it’s hard to sit still when a Freedom Call album is playing. Beyond takes the band back to the familiar lyrical territory of warriors, enchanted lands and unity in metal. Yes, it’s cheesy and yes, it’s a little weird to hear battle hymns sung in such a high octave, but it’s so damned hard to resist when these guys get going.

Track listing

Personnel
Chris Bay – vocals, guitar
Lars Rettkowitz – rhythm guitar
Ilker Ersin – bass guitar
Ramy Ali – drums

Charts
 Czech Republic #38 (Album charts)
 Germany #33 (Media Market/Saturn Charts)
 Germany #41 (Album charts)
 Sweden #15 (Hard rock charts)
 Sweden #99 (Album charts)
 Switzerland #74

References

External links 
 Official website of Freedom Call
 INTERVIEW WITH CHRIS BAY FROM FREEDOM CALL ABOUT NEW ALBUM " BEYOND " 2014 BY ROCKNLIVE PROD
 FREEDOM CALL - "Union Of The Strong" (OFFICIAL VIDEO) (Beyond)

2014 albums
Freedom Call albums
SPV/Steamhammer albums